Jiang Shunfu (1453–1504), name Shaozong (韶宗), Courtesy name Shufu (named from legendary Shun) as a Chinese mandarin of the sixth rank under the Hongzhi Emperor during the Ming dynasty. He is best remembered today for a portrait displaying him in his official robes, one of the most famous such works from the era.

See also
 Chinese painting

References

1453 births
1504 deaths
Ming dynasty people